The third season of the TV Land's original sitcom The Exes premiered on June 19, 2013. A total of 20 episodes were produced for the third season. The series stars Donald Faison, Wayne Knight, Kristen Johnston, David Alan Basche and Kelly Stables.

Cast
 Donald Faison as Phil Chase
 Wayne Knight as Haskell Lutz
 David Alan Basche as Stuart Gardner 
 Kelly Stables as Eden Konkler
 Kristen Johnston as Holly Franklin

Production
On December 13, 2012, TV Land renewed The Exes for a third season of 10 episodes, set to premiere on June 19, 2013. Season three of The Exes began taping on March 27, 2013. Guest stars for this season include Jodi Lyn O'Keefe as a sex shop employee; Leslie Jordan as Percy, the president of the condo board; and Stacey Dash as Dana, a recommitted virgin who begins dating Phil. Dash's guest appearance reunited her with Donald Faison, they both co-starred together in the film Clueless and the television series of the same name. Additional guest stars include Grant Show as Alex, a perfect guy whom Phil, Haskell and Stuart meet on an internet dating site when they pose as Holly; Fred Dryer as Holly's boss; Cat Deeley as Charlotte, a beautiful woman (except for one flaw) that Stuart dates; Tyler Posey as Eric, a law student who develops a crush on Holly;, Lisa Ann Walter as Margo, Haskell's ex-wife; and Brandon Routh as Steve, a bartender at the bar the group frequents. Reprising roles from previous seasons were Diedrich Bader as Holly's boyfriend, Paul; Todd Stashwick as Phil's boss, Grant; and Janet Varney as Stuart's ex-wife, Lorna. Missi Pyle appears in a dual role as a sex addict named Sabrina, as well as Sabrina's wholesome identical twin, Julie. Leah Remini also recurred this season as Stuart's sister, Nicki. Johnston and Knight's former 3rd Rock From the Sun co-star Elmarie Wendel, guest starred in the season finale as Ruthie. On July 18, 2013, TV Land extended the episode order for season three to 20 episodes. Episode ten served as the summer finale, with the remainder of the season returning in December. Kristen Johnston was absent from a couple of episodes this season due to receiving treatment from being diagnosed with Lupus Myelitis.

Episodes

References

External links
 

2013 American television seasons
2014 American television seasons